Khalid Akhtar (born 4 November 1941) is a Pakistani sailor. He competed in the 1984 Summer Olympics.

References

1941 births
Living people
Sailors at the 1984 Summer Olympics – Soling
Pakistani male sailors (sport)
Olympic sailors of Pakistan
Medalists at the 1982 Asian Games
Sailors at the 1982 Asian Games
Asian Games gold medalists for Pakistan
Asian Games medalists in sailing
20th-century Pakistani people